Book of Memories may refer to:

A Book of Memories, a 1986 novel
Silent Hill: Book of Memories, a 2012 video game

See also
 Book of remembrance